Nara is located in District Rawalpindi, Tehsil Kahuta and province Punjab, Pakistan which is 74 km far from capital towards east. It was known as the home of many Sikh families before partition, and a main market in the area.

Nara

Noticeable aspects of Nara 

It is center of five union councils. It is commercial area to its suburbs. Government has constructed a separate school for girls and for boys here. In 2014 the boy school building at Nara Chowk was reconstructed. Nara possesses a library, post office and many commercial center within itself.Mostly villages are touch to Nara in which, Khateel Hoon, Bahgoon, Barsala, Baryah, Kalyah, Khalol, Byor, Jnatal, Lehri, Salgran, Band, Bahrothi,Plahi mohra,Nori Morah,makhi choha,kund,batli,sweri,dokh muglaan, and some other village are belong to Nara city for their daily requirements.

History 
According to the elder nara was city ruled by Sikhs before independence of Pakistan and the last remaining building named lakhi chobara might be a proof of that. Lakhi Chobara belonged to Chaudhri Lakhmi Das Johar, who moved to Jagadhri and Ambala after the partition. His brother was Ravel Chand Johar, whose house was rented by the local post office nearby. Ravel Chand moved to Kanpur after partition, where he retired as the Postmaster. The descendants of the family continue to live in New Delhi. Pre partition Muslims, Hindu and Sikhs all lived a harmonious life in the village.

language 
Nara natives speaks Pothwari/Punjabi.

Culture 
The majority of people in the Nara Matore region are Muslims. Caste is still considered important there, which is the principal reason that Nara Matore has remained impoverished.

Transportation 
The basic source of transportation within the village are via taxis and personal bike while the settlers have to choose a public transport for going outside the village.

Source Of Earnings 
Nara people are connected with employment outside the city, some have their own businesses, the rest are engaged in agriculture and Majorities are settled in foreign Countries.

Famous Schools Of Nara 
Govt. High Secondary School and PaK Science Academy Nara (Private).

External links 
 Pictures Of Nara at NaraCity-Official Page

References

Towns in Rawalpindi District
Populated places in Kahuta Tehsil